Fraternitas Baltica was a Baltic-German fraternity founded in Riga. Its motto was Freundschaft, Frohsinn, Tugend, Wissen - soll man nie bei den Balten missen. (Friendship, Happiness, Virtue and Knowledge, these are the things that none of Balts should miss.) and In Treuen fest (Strong in confidence).

History
Fraternitas Baltica was founded in Rīga Polytechnic Institute, as Fraternitas Polytechnici Baltici. In 1867 Fraternitas Baltica with students founded General Polytechnic Convention (APC), which led the social life in Polytechnic Institute. In 1869 after disagreements, many students left the fraternity and founded Concordia Rigensis, which is still working today. At the time of WWI, when RPI evacuated to Moscow, fraternity suspended activity.
After World War I, in 1918 Fraternitas Baltica restored operations as a part of Baltic Technical College. Later that year, a decision was made that all of the active members have to join Baltic-German military units. 
In 1920 F-B was registered as a fraternity of University of Latvia, and it was admitted in Fraternity Presidium Convent (P!K!), which Fraternitas Baltica left in 1932, as a protest for decision to use only Latvian language in their meetings. In 1932 after U.L.'s decision it was closed as a fraternity, but still existed as a society, keeping the name "fraternity". In 1938 Fraternitas Baltica ceased active operations, but in 1939 was closed completely with all of the members going to Germany.
In 1959, Fraternitas Baltica and other Baltic-German fraternity philisters participated in founding of Curonia Goettingensis, which is later declared as a Baltic fraternity traditions continuation.

External links 
 Fraternitas Baltica (1865 — 1965)

Baltic fraternities and sororities
International student societies
Baltic-German people
Student organizations established in 1867
1867 establishments in the Russian Empire